Dario Coates (born 25 April 1992, in Hebden Bridge) is an English actor. He is known for portraying Alex Neeson in the television ITV soap Coronation Street. He attended Calder High School and Calderdale Theatre School. He acted in Calderdale Theatre School's production of the Philip Pullman novels His Dark Materials, for which he received acclaim from The Halifax Courier.

In 2016 he appeared in the BBC series The Coroner episode 2.4 "The Beast of Lighthaven" as Ben Fairhead.

Filmography

Film

Television

Video games

References

People from Hebden Bridge
21st-century English male actors
English male soap opera actors
English male video game actors
English television actors
1992 births
Living people